A hypervariable region (HVR) is a location within nuclear DNA or the D-loop of mitochondrial DNA in which base pairs of nucleotides repeat (in the case of nuclear DNA) or have substitutions (in the case of mitochondrial DNA). Changes or repeats in the hypervariable region are highly polymorphic.

Mitochondrial

There are two MITOCHONDRIAL hypervariable regions used in human mitochondrial genealogical DNA testing. HVR1 is considered a "low resolution" region and HVR2 is considered a "high resolution" region. Getting HVR1 and HVR2 DNA tests can help determine one's haplogroup. In the revised Cambridge Reference Sequence of the human mitogenome, the most variable sites of HVR1 are numbered 16024-16383 (this subsequence is called HVR-I), and the most variable sites of HVR2 are numbered 57-372 (i.e., HVR-II) and 438-574 (i.e., HVR-III).

In some bony fishes, for example certain Protacanthopterygii and Gadidae, the mitochondrial control region evolves remarkably slowly. Even functional mitochondrial genes accumulate mutations faster and more freely. It is not known whether such hypovariable control regions are more widespread. In the Ayu (Plecoglossus altivelis), an East Asian protacanthopterygian, control region mutation rate is not markedly lowered, but sequence differences between subspecies are far lower in the control region than elsewhere. This phenomenon completely defies explanation at present.

Antibodies

In antibodies, hypervariable regions form the antigen-binding site and are found on both light and heavy chains. They also contribute to the specificity of each antibody. In a variable domain, the 3 HV segments of each heavy or light chain fold together at the N-terminus to form an antigen binding pocket.

See also
 Cambridge Reference Sequence
 Genealogical DNA test
 Human mitochondrial DNA haplogroup
 mtDNA control region

References

External links
 
 DNA: Forensic and Legal Applications, Explanation of Hypervariable Regions

Genetic genealogy
Genetic engineering
Antibodies